

Turkic ng 

In Turkic dialects, it represented the velar . An example is the word دݣز (däŋiz, “sea”), compare deniz in modern Turkish, and deñiz in Kyrgyz, Turkmen, Uyghur and Uzbek.

Turkic languages 
The letter is used or has been used to write:
Chagatai
Kazakh
Kirghiz
Azerbaijani
Ottoman Turkish
Uyghur

Xiao'erjing 
The Xiao'erjing script variant  is used to spell  in Sinitic languages such as Mandarin (especially the Lanyin, Zhongyuan and Northeastern dialects) or the Dungan language.

Southeast Asian ng 

 Jawi script to write:
Acehnese
Banjarese
Kerinci
Maguindanaon
Malay
Minangkabau
Tausūg
Ternate
 Pegon script to write:
Javanese
Sundanese
 Arabic Afrikaans to write Afrikaans historically, called ngīn 

The Arabic letter  was also used historically in the Arebica script for Serbo-Croatian by Čičak-Al-Zubi to spell .

Wolof ng 

Tamil ng 

The script is called Arwi when used for Tamil language.

See also
 Kāf
 Ghayn
 Gaf#Gaf with three dots
 ڳ (Gueh), used in Sindhi and Saraiki

References

Arabic script